Vltava is the largest Czech restaurant in Finland, located in central Helsinki. It was opened in spring 2005 to a Jugend architecture building protected by the Finnish National Board of Antiquities, located on the Elielinaukio square, between the Helsinki Central railway station and the main building of the Finnish post office. The name of the restaurant comes from the Vltava river (Moldau in German), running through Prague and the Czech Republic. The restaurant is owned by HOK-Elanto.

Spaces
The restaurant has 389 customer spaces indoors and 126 on its summer terrace. There are five restaurant facilities on four floors. The interior has been designed by interior architect Pekka Perjo.

History of the building
The restaurant is located in a Jugend building protected by the National Board of Antiquities. The building has previously served as Finnair's city terminal and VR Group's cargo storehold. The building has stood at the site since the early 20th century, when it was part of an industrial and railroad area stretching from the railway station to the Töölönlahti bay. In 1978, the building's extension towards Töölönlahti was dismantled. The extension had hosted VR's construction works which had made locomotives up to the 1950s.

The exact date of the building's construction is not known: depending on the source it has been cited as either 1898, 1899, 1909 or 1911. The designer has been cited as either Eliel Saarinen, who designed the railway station nearby, or Bruno Granholm, the chief architect of the board of the Finnish railways.

External links

 Official site

Czech restaurants
Restaurants in Helsinki
Art Nouveau architecture in Helsinki
European restaurants in Finland